Gorytvesica homaema is a species of moth of the family Tortricidae. It is found in Napo Province, Ecuador.

The wingspan is 18 mm. The wings are rusty, suffused and sprinkled with brown. The hindwings are grey, but blackish from beyond the middle.

Etymology
The species name refers to the similarity with Gorytvesica sychnopina and is derived from Greek homaimos (meaning of allied blood).

References

Moths described in 2005
Euliini
Moths of South America
Taxa named by Józef Razowski